Melinda S. Smyser (born October 29, 1958) is an American politician who served as a member of the Idaho Senate from 2009 to 2012, representing District 11. Smyser previously served as Director of the Idaho Department of Labor and currently serves as the director of the Idaho Office of Drug Policy.

Early life and education 
Smyser was born in Caldwell, Idaho and raised in Middleton, where she graduated from Middleton High School.

Smyser received a Bachelor of Science with a double major in C/T/Design and Education and Extension from the University of Idaho. She also received a master's degree in Education and Counseling from the College of Idaho.

Career 
Smyser began her career a teacher in the Wilder School District. She worked as a counselor at the Parma School District from 1984 to 1989, and at Caldwell Alternative High School Counselor from 1989 to 1997. She served as the Public Relations coordinator for the Caldwell School District from 1998 to 2000.

Smyser was an Idaho elector for the 2008 United States presidential election for John McCain. She also served as the Canyon County, Idaho Republican Party Chair. Since June 2020 Smsyer serves has Canyon County Republican Party Committeewoman.

In 2014, she managed Jim Risch's Senate re-election campaign. She worked in his Senate office as Southwest Regional Director from 2012 to 2017.

She was one of Idaho's four GOP presidential electors in the 2016 United States presidential election until December 15, 2016, where she was informed that she is constitutionally barred as a federal employee from serving as an electors. (She at the time worked for Senator Jim Risch) She was replaced by her husband C. A. "Skip" Smyser.

Senate 
In 2009, Smyser was appointed to represent Idaho's 11th legislative district which encompasses both Gem and Canyon counties after Brad Little was appointed lieutenant governor.

In 2010 she was elected with 10,386 votes (73.3%) against Democrat Shannon L. Forrester and independent Kirsten Faith Richardson.

On March 5, 2012, Smyser announced that she would not be seeking re-election; since redistricting would have forced a primary contest with fellow Republican Senator Patti Anne Lodge in the newly redrawn District 11, stating "I have every intention to stay involved and I will announce my future plans soon."

Later career 
Smyser was seen as a potential candidate in the 2018 Idaho election for lieutenant governor.

On September 29, 2017, Governor Butch Otter announcing that Smyser would replace Ken Emmunds as Director of the Idaho Department of Labor. In 2019, she was appointed by Governor Brad Little to serve as Director of the Idaho Office of Drug Policy.

Smyser was an elector in the Electoral College in 2016 and 2020, both times voting for Donald Trump.

Personal life 
Smyser is married to C. A. "Skip" Smyser, an attorney and businessman who serves as the founder and CEO of Lobby Idaho, LLC, a lobbying firm based in Boise. They have four children.

References

1958 births
Living people
College of Idaho alumni
Republican Party Idaho state senators
People from Caldwell, Idaho
University of Idaho alumni
Women state legislators in Idaho
2008 United States presidential electors
2016 United States presidential electors
21st-century American politicians
21st-century American women politicians
People from Middleton, Idaho
People from Parma, Idaho
State cabinet secretaries of Idaho
2020 United States presidential electors